Susanne Ditlevsen is a Danish mathematician and statistician, interested in mathematical biology, perception, dynamical systems, and statistical modeling of biological systems.
She is a professor in the Department of Mathematical Sciences of the University of Copenhagen, where she heads the section of statistics and probability theory.

Education
Ditlevsen was an actor before she became a researcher.
She completed her Ph.D. in 2004 at the University of Copenhagen. Her dissertation, Modeling of physiological processes by stochastic differential equations, was supervised by Michael Sørensen.

Recognition
In 2012, Ditlevsen became an elected member of the International Statistical Institute.
In 2016, Ditlevsen was elected to the Royal Danish Academy of Sciences and Letters.

References

External links
Home page

Year of birth missing (living people)
Living people
Danish mathematicians
Danish statisticians
Danish women mathematicians
Women statisticians
Academic staff of the University of Copenhagen
Elected Members of the International Statistical Institute
Members of the Royal Danish Academy of Sciences and Letters